Tab is an unincorporated hamlet in Warren County, state of Indiana, United States.  Its only current business or service is the Tabor Grain Company (a subsidiary of Archer Daniels Midland) which operates the town's grain elevators.  The present population of Tab is approximately 45.

History 
The town was platted on November 25, 1905, by Harrison "Tab" Goodwine, who donated land for the town and the railroad. A post office was established in Tab on April 8, 1907, and closed on April 30, 1955.

Tab was home to a number of businesses in the early 20th century, including a hotel, lumberyard, hardware store, bank, blacksmith, barber shop, pool hall, telephone office, auto repair shop, two grocery stores and a Standard Oil bulk plant.  There was also a train station, plus livestock pens for those animals being shipped.  An annual Fall Festival used to be held which featured sack races, tug-of-war, baseball, hog-calling contests and competitions for who could harness and unharness a team of horses the fastest.

Geography 
Tab is located in the northwestern part of the county at the intersection of County Road 650 North and the Bee Line Railroad.  Jordan Creek begins a few miles northeast of town and flows past Tab to the east.

Demographics

References 

Unincorporated communities in Indiana
Unincorporated communities in Warren County, Indiana
Populated places established in 1905